Renzo José Ignacio Alfani (born 18 February 1996) is an Argentine professional footballer who plays as a centre-back for Carlos A. Mannucci.

Career
After joining Rosario Central in 2013, Alfani began his senior career with the club in late-2016 when he was an unused substitute for league matches with Olimpo and Lanús; which preceded his professional debut on 18 December during a victory against Belgrano. He subsequently made three further appearances in all competitions during 2016–17. In November 2017, Alfani was loaned to Primera B Nacional team Villa Dálmine. In January 2019, Alfani was announced as a new signing for Santos in the Peruvian Segunda División. He scored his first senior goal on 26 May in a 2–0 win over Atlético Grau.

In 2020, Alfani moved up to Peru's Primera División with Deportivo Municipal; alongside Matías Mansilla, who had also been his teammate at Rosario and Santos. He scored goals against Carlos Stein and Alianza Lima whilst appearing sixteen times. In December 2020, Alfani agreed terms with fellow Peruvian top-flight outfit Carlos A. Mannucci ahead of the 2021 campaign.

Career statistics
.

References

External links

1996 births
Living people
Footballers from Rosario, Santa Fe
Argentine people of Italian descent
Argentine footballers
Association football defenders
Argentine expatriate footballers
Expatriate footballers in Peru
Argentine expatriate sportspeople in Peru
Argentine Primera División players
Primera Nacional players
Peruvian Segunda División players
Peruvian Primera División players
Rosario Central footballers
Villa Dálmine footballers
Santos de Nasca players
Deportivo Municipal footballers
Carlos A. Mannucci players